Catoblepia xanthus is a butterfly of the family Nymphalidae. It is found in northern South America.

Subspecies
Catoblepia xanthus xanthus (Peru, Guianas)
Catoblepia xanthus rivalis Niepelt, 1911 (Ecuador)

References

Butterflies described in 1758
Morphinae
Nymphalidae of South America
Taxa named by Carl Linnaeus